Navigator is an album by American jazz instrumentalist Paul McCandless recorded in 1981 for the Landslide label.  It was re-released in 1994.

Track listing
 "Julian" - 6:57
 "Now and Then" - 5:38
 "Helix" - 4:26
 "Non-Navigator" - 2:17
 "The Great Lawn" - 5:31
 "Willow" - 8:26
 "Circle Waltz" - 5:16
 "Synapse – The Well" - 3:01
 "Downstream" - 7:30
Recorded at Right Track Recording (now MSR) in New York City on February 1981

Personnel
Paul McCandless - Soprano Saxophone, Oboe, English Horn, Bass Clarinet
Steve Rodby - Acoustic Bass
David Samuels - Vibraphone, Marimba, Percussion, Voice
Ross Traut - Electric Guitar, Sitar
Jay Clayton - vocals
Linda Namias - Handclaps

References

1981 albums
Paul McCandless albums